Iloc or ILOC may refer to:
Indian Law and Order Commission, United States government body focusing on legal issues in Native American Indian communities
Initial Logistics Officers' Course, course for Supply Officer (Royal Navy)
Interim Libor Oversight Committee, established by the British Bankers Association as a result of the Libor scandal
Iloc Island, also known as Barangonan, barangay and island in Linapacan Municipality, Palawan Province, Philippines 
Cristina Casandra, maiden name Cristina Iloc, Romanian long-distance runner

See also